Sheykheh Kureh (also Romanized as Sheykheh Kūreh; also known as Shaikh Kuwaireh, Sheikh Kooreh, Sheykheh Kōreh, Sheykheh Koveyreh, Sheykh Khowreh, and Sheykh Kūreh) is a village in Sarkal Rural District, in the Central District of Marivan County, Kurdistan Province, Iran. At the 2006 census, its population was 191, in 42 families. The village is populated by Kurds.

References 

Towns and villages in Marivan County
Kurdish settlements in Kurdistan Province